Jordanian-Russian relations are foreign relations between Russia and Jordan. Russia has an embassy in Amman, while Jordan has an embassy in Moscow. Both countries established diplomatic relations on August 20, 1963.

Relations between both countries were previously very strong and friendly but declined quickly in the early 21st century. Russian Presidents Vladimir Putin and Dmitry Medvedev have visited Jordan several times and have met with Jordanian King Abdullah II.

Russian Embassy 
The Russian embassy is located in Amman.

 Ambassador Gleb Desyatnikov

Jordan Embassy 
The Jordan embassy is located in Moscow.

 Ambassador Khaled Shawabkeh

See also 
List of ambassadors of Russia to Jordan

External links 
Embassy of The Russian Federation - Amman

References

 
Bilateral relations of Russia
Russia